Jens Christer Bertil Olsson (born 15 December 1964) is a Swedish retired male badminton player. He competed at the 1992 Barcelona Summer Olympic Games and 1996 Atlanta Summer Olympic Games in men's singles event.

Achievements

IBF World Grand Prix 
The World Badminton Grand Prix sanctioned by International Badminton Federation (IBF) from 1983 to 2006.

Men's singles

References

External links
 
 
 
 
 

Living people
1964 births
Swedish male badminton players
Olympic badminton players of Sweden
Badminton players at the 1992 Summer Olympics
Badminton players at the 1996 Summer Olympics
People from Färgelanda Municipality
Sportspeople from Västra Götaland County
20th-century Swedish people